Sheep (Ovis aries) are quadrupedal, ruminant mammals that are typically kept as livestock.

Sheep may also refer to:

Animals
 Ovis, a genus including domestic sheep, bighorn sheep, Dall sheep, argali, and mouflon
 Sheep (meat), or lamb and mutton, the meat of domestic sheep
 :Category:Sheep breeds

Arts and entertainment

Fictional characters
 The Sheep, a character in Through the Looking-Glass by Lewis Carroll
 Sheep, a character in WordWorld
 The Sheep, characters from Animal Farm

Music
 Sheep (album) or the title song, by Zoë Lewis, 1998
 Sheep (EP), by Smile Empty Soul, 2019
 Sheep (mixtape), by Arca, 2015
 "Sheep" (The Housemartins song), 1986
 "Sheep" (Lay song), 2017
 "Sheep" (Pink Floyd song), 1977

Other media
 Sheep (novel), a 1994 novel by Simon Maginn
 Sheep (video game), a 2000 puzzle video game
 The Sheep (film), a 1920 Italian silent film
 Sheeep (animated series), a British children's animated television series

Other uses
 SHEEP (symbolic computation system)
 Sheep (zodiac) or Goat, a sign of the Chinese zodiac
 Sheep, a term for unquestioningly obedient, naive, or innocent followers

See also 
 List of fictional sheep
 Aries (constellation), the sheep constellation
 Barbary sheep, a genus of rare or extinct ruminants
 Counting sheep
 Electric Sheep (disambiguation)
 Sheep Creek
 Sheep Island (disambiguation)
 Sheep Mountain (disambiguation)
 Sheep to shawl
 Sheeple